The Svinfylking, Old Norse for 'Swine Array' or 'Boar Snout', was a formation used in battle, related to the wedge formation, which was used in Iron Age Scandinavia and later by the Vikings. It was also used by Germanic peoples during the Germanic Iron Age where it was known as the "Schweinskopf" or "Swine's Head". Its invention was attributed to the god Odin.

The apex was composed of a single file. The number of warriors then increases by a constant in each rank back to its base. Families and tribesmen were ranked side by side and this added moral cohesion. The tactic was admirable for an advance against a line or even a column, but it was poor in the event of a retreat.

The formation consisted of heavily armed, presumably hand-to-hand warriors and less-armored archers grouped in a triangle formation with the warriors in the front lines protecting the archers in center or rear. Cavalry charging a group in Svinfylking formation were frequently attacked by the outer warriors with spears causing complete chaos among the horses. The swine array could also be used as a wedge to break through enemy lines. Several Svinfylking formations can be grouped side by side, appearing something like a zig-zag, to press or break the opposition's ranks. The weakness of the swine array was that it could not handle flanking. The swine array was based on a monumental shock. If the swine array did not break the enemy lines immediately, then the warriors in the swine array would not hold long.

See also
Flying wedge

References

Viking practices
Early Germanic warfare
Tactical formations